Edens Edge EP is a five-song extended play released from country music group Edens Edge. The extended play is the group's first release on Big Machine Records. It was released on May 24, 2011, and peaked at No. 43 on the Top Heatseekers chart. It features their debut single, "Amen", which was a Top 20 hit on the Hot Country Songs charts.

All songs from the EP except for "Slow Motion" later appeared on the band's self-titled debut album.

Track listing

Chart performance
Edens Edge peaked at No. 43 on the Top Heatseekers chart.

References

2011 debut EPs
Edens Edge EPs
Big Machine Records EPs
Albums produced by Mark Bright (record producer)